Troy Corbett (born 11 October 1972) is an Australian former cricketer. He played 13 first-class cricket matches for Victoria between 1994 and 1997.

See also
 List of Victoria first-class cricketers

References

External links
 

1972 births
Living people
Australian cricketers
Victoria cricketers